Mainova AG (FWB: MNV6) is one of the largest regional energy suppliers in Germany and supplies about one million people in Hessen and neighboring provinces with electricity, gas, heat and water. It is based in Frankfurt am Main.

History
Mainova AG was formed in 1998 through the merger of Stadtwerke Frankfurt am Main GmbH and Maingas AG.

Corporate structure
The energy and water utility has approximately 2,900 employees and posted 2009 sales of €1.66 billion. The largest shareholder of Mainova are the government of Frankfurt am Main with a 75.2% ownership stake of shares and Thüga AG with 24.4% of the shares. The remaining shares (0.4%) are freely floated. The board members are Dr. Constantin Alsheimer (CEO), Norbert Breidenbach, Dr. Peter Birkner and Lothar Herbst. The Chairman of Mainova is city treasurer Uwe Becker.

Gallery

References
 Geschäftsbericht 2009 Mainova AG (PDF-Datei; 5,1 MB)
 Personalbericht 2009 Mainova AG (PDF-Datei; 8,63 MB)
 Umweltbericht 2010 Mainova AG (PDF-Datei; 1,96 MB)

External links
 

Companies established in 1998
Electric power companies of Germany
Companies listed on the Frankfurt Stock Exchange
Government-owned companies of Germany